Telisha Shaw (born October 4, 1978) is an American retired actress, dancer, and singer. She is best known for dancing with such artists as Janet Jackson, Christina Aguilera, and Green Day, as well as her roles on Weeds and It's Always Sunny in Philadelphia and starring in Dirty opposite Cuba Gooding Jr. She starred as Felicia in Buena Vista Pictures' Step Up 2: The Streets, out February 2008.

Early life
Shaw, born in Memphis, Tennessee. She began studying ballet at the age of three and later, at age 11, received a scholarship to the Dance Theatre of Harlem under the direction of Arthur Mitchell.

She attended the University of Tennessee at Knoxville as a dance major. After finishing at the University of Tennessee, she moved to Los Angeles, California, to become a professional dancer and to concentrate on her acting career.

Career
Shaw made her film debut in the crime thriller Dirty as the young, drug-addicted girlfriend of Cuba Gooding Jr. She then landed guest appearances on Weeds, It's Always Sunny in Philadelphia, Campus Ladies, and Studio 60 on the Sunset Strip. Shaw next appeared in Step Up 2: The Streets released in February 2008.

Filmography

References

External links

1978 births
African-American actresses
American film actresses
American female dancers
American dancers
Living people
Actresses from Memphis, Tennessee
University of Tennessee alumni
21st-century African-American people
21st-century African-American women
20th-century African-American people
20th-century African-American women